Philipp Kurashev (born 12 October 1999) is a Swiss-Russian professional ice hockey centre for the   Chicago Blackhawks of the National Hockey League (NHL). Kurashev was drafted 120th overall by the Chicago Blackhawks in the 2018 NHL Entry Draft.

Playing career
Kurashev played his junior hockey in the Quebec Major Junior Hockey League (QMJHL) for the Quebec Remparts. He played 183 regular season games and put up 179 points (69 goals) over three seasons. He also played 17 playoff games, putting up 13 points (3 goals).

On 12 March 2019, Kurashev signed a three-year, entry-level contract with the Chicago Blackhawks. He reported to the Rockford IceHogs at the end of his junior season and made his professional debut on 5 April 2019.

Prior to the 2020–21 season, with the North America season delayed due to the COVID-19 pandemic, Kurashev remained in Switzerland as he was loaned to the National League (NL) club, HC Lugano, on 6 September 2020. Kurashev made his NHL debut with the Blackhawks on 15 January 2021 against the Tampa Bay Lightning. Four days later, on 19 January, Kurashev scored his first NHL goal against Sergei Bobrovsky of the Florida Panthers.

International play
Kurashev was named to Switzerland men's national team for the 2019 IIHF World Championship in Slovakia.

Personal life
Kurashev is the son of Russian former professional hockey player Konstantin Kurashev. He holds Swiss and Russian dual citizenship, and is fluent in English, German, and Russian.

Career statistics

Regular season and playoffs

International

References

External links
 

1999 births
Living people
Chicago Blackhawks draft picks
HC Lugano players
Quebec Remparts players
Rockford IceHogs (AHL) players
Swiss ice hockey centres
Swiss people of Russian descent
People from Davos
Sportspeople from Graubünden